Conservatives of Catalonia (CiC) was a Spanish political party of Catalan scope directed by Juan Parra Balcells -an independent candidate to the Senate of Spain in the general elections of 1977 and who had been one of the founders of the Progressive Democratic Party- and Santiago Brutau Cirera, who acted as vice president of the party. It was officially registered before the Spanish Ministry of the Interior on January 30, 1980.

It was a conservative, nationalist and liberal party, which was presented to the elections of the Parliament of Catalonia in 1980 and obtained 4095 votes (0.15% votes). It also appeared in the general election of 1982, where it obtained 2596 votes.

Electoral program in the 1980 election
 Defense of Christian values.
 Maintenance and defense of Catalan culture.
 Defense of the integrity of Spain and the uniqueness of the peoples that make it up.
 Maintenance of the free enterprise system.
 Nationalization of public services necessary for national operation.

References

Defunct political parties in Catalonia
Political parties established in 1980
Political parties disestablished in 1982